Who? Weekly is a bi-weekly celebrity gossip podcast presented by Bobby Finger and Lindsey Weber. Focusing on tabloid coverage of celebrities, it tackles, according to the tagline, "everything you need to know about the celebrities you don't".

History
Who? Weekly began as an occasional newsletter written by friends and pop-culture writers Bobby Finger and Lindsey Weber before spinning off into a podcast. The first episode was aired on January 18, 2016  on the HeadGum network. The podcast is currently released independently.

In both the newsletter and in the podcast, celebrities, ex-reality television contestants, YouTube stars, broadway actors, and social media influencers are categorized as either "Whos" or "Thems" – roughly D-list vs A-list celebrities – according to their name recognition and the nature of their fame. Whos and Thems are named for the likely response to hearing a person's name: "who?" vs "oh, them!" This extends into, for example, describing behavior as "who-y", if it is seen as self-promotional or tacky, for example producing "sponcon" (sponsored content) or writing public apologies on Notes app. Although mainly dividing the celebrity landscape between "Whos" and "Thems", the podcast has also created the categories "T.H.A.M.P.S." (or THAMPS) for the pseudo-famous Trainers, Hairstylists, Agents, Makeup Artists, Publicists and Stylists, and "Nahs" for people that might be in the public eye, but are not famous enough to even be considered a Who.

The duo continued releasing weekly newsletters as an accompaniment to the podcast episodes for paid supporters on Patreon. As of 2020, the newsletter has been replaced with Who? Daily, consisting of four mini-episodes a week with stories not covered in the main podcast episodes.

Beginning in October 2017, there have been a series of live Who? Weekly shows across the United States.

On February 19, 2021, Who Weekly released its 500th episode.

Format and recurring segments
Episodes air twice weekly and alternate between the main episode discussing topical celebrity news and "Who's There" episodes, which consist of responses to callers' questions and stories left on the podcast hotline.

Main episode

I Don’t Know Her 
Described as a "deranged version of six degrees of separation", the hosts speculate if a specific 'Them' celebrity knows a specific 'Who' celebrity.

What's Rita Up To? 
Main episodes end with the segment What's Rita Up To?, featuring an update on the activities of singer Rita Ora. They cover what the tabloids write about her and her relative anonymity in the United States.

The Most Markle-est Headline of the Week 
In the lead up to the wedding of Prince Harry and Meghan Markle in 2018, a recurring segment looked at news articles pertaining to the wedding, often revolving around Markle's various family members speaking to the press. The segment returned periodically since the wedding occurred.

Benana 
Finger and Weber coined the term 'Benana' to refer to the relationship of actors Ben Affleck and Ana de Armas and started a weekly segment looking at what the couple had done that week. The segment ended in 2021 after the couple separated.

Sign-offs 
Callers traditionally sign-off with in-jokes from earlier episodes, - the most iconic being, "crunch crunch!" - but including: "Good form, Bella Thorne", "Me in Greece", "ScarJo YummyPop", "Forehead Diamond", "Me and Charna!", "Livin' la vida laptop," and "Women don't belong in balloons".

Who's There 
Who's There episodes were a later addition to the show, added after fans began contacting the hosts asking about the identity of various celebrities. The hosts consider the call-in show an integral part of the podcast as it opened up a dialogue between the hosts and their fan base and created a sense of community between the fans.

Who Dat? 
"Who Dat?" is an occasional episode focusing on Black celebrities, which first occurred in 2016. The episodes feature guest hosts Aminatou Sow and Shani O. Hilton.

Fanbase 
Who? Weekly fans are collectively called Wholigans. The Wholigan Facebook group has 17,000 members and includes not only listeners but industry insiders who discuss celebrity sightings, news, rumors and deep dives. Notably, the search for "who-y" behavior has led the group to discover in 2017 that then-White House Press Secretary Sean Spicer had an open account on mobile payment service Venmo. They began asking for payments as a form of trolling, causing some press attention.

Celebrity callers to Who's There have included Lena Dunham, Lea DeLaria, and Richard Curtis.

Reception
Slate's Brow Beat described Who? Weekly as "terrific" and said that the show "feels smart and fun because it’s sometimes messy, not in spite of its messiness". The podcast was chosen as one of the best podcasts of 2016 by The New York Times, who said that "the podcast feels delightfully absurd and truly vital in the Trump era", and by Vulture, who said it "has quickly become a cult hit". It has also been recommended by Nylon, Esquire, Marie Claire, Vogue and The New Yorker. [35]

References
35. Syme, Rachel (31 May 2021). " 'Who? Weekly' Explains the New Celebrity" The New Yorker. Retrieved 3 April 2022.

External links

Who? Weekly newsletter archived on TinyLetter

Comedy and humor podcasts
2016 podcast debuts
Audio podcasts
American podcasts